Malleostemon tuberculatus is a plant species of the family Myrtaceae endemic to Western Australia.

It blooms between July and November producing pink-white flowers.

It is found on sand plains and among granite outcrops in an area in the extending from the Mid West into the Wheatbelt and Goldfields-Esperance regions of Western Australia where it grows in sandy or clay or loamy soils sometimes over laterite.

References

tuberculatus
Flora of Western Australia
Plants described in 1983